"Flower" (stylized as flower) is Koda Kumi's 17th domestic single. Flower was written as the theme song for the novel Koibana (恋バナ / Love Story) and also used in the television advertisement for the novel. The lyrics were written by the author of Koibana, Yoshi. This was also the first domestic single released by Kumi that was not accompanied by a promotional music video. It reached No. 4 on the weekly Oricon Chart.

Information
flower is Japanese singer-songwriter Kumi Koda's seventeenth single. The song was a pop ballad and was her first single to not have a corresponding music video. It peaked at No. 4 on the Oricon Singles Charts, despite not having a music video, and remained on the charts for ten weeks.

The single was released after her success of single "Butterfly," which was the artist's first number-one single. "flower" was used as the theme song to the novel Koibana, which was written by Yoshi. Yoshi had also written the lyrics to the song, reflecting the meaning of the story.

The song would be placed on Kumi's first compilation album, Best ~first things~. The song still did not garner a music video on the album. Kumi would perform this song during the encore for her Live Tour 2005 ~first things~.

Track listing

Chart history

Oricon 2005 Singles Top 999
Chart position: #165

Sales
First week estimate: 36,859
Total estimate: 106,099

References

Avex Network (2005), Kumi Koda Official Web Site
Oricon Style (2005), Ranking – Oricon Style
Kyoto International Culture Forum (2005), KICF – Members: Yoshi

2005 singles
2005 songs
Koda Kumi songs
Rhythm Zone singles